Netrang  is a town in the Netrang taluka in Bharuch district of the Indian state of Gujarat.

Geography and climate
The summer begins in early March and lasts until June. April and May are the hottest months, the average maximum temperature being . October and November see the retreat of the monsoon and a return of high temperatures until late November.

Transport
Netrang is well connected by National Highway 753B, National Highway 56 & Gujarat State Highways 13, 5, and 163. The nearest airport to Netrang are the Surat Airport and the Civil Airport Harni in Vadodara, 100 kilometres (62 mi) north of Netrang.

Education 

 Smt. M M Bhakta Highschool
 Gujarati Prathmik Sala (Gujarati Primary School) Gandhi Bajar
 Gujarati Sala (Juna Netrang)
 Shri R K Bhakta School
 Sandipani School
 GSL Public School (Pre-primary School)
 Prathmik Sala (Kosyakola)
 Aadarsh Nivasi Sala
 Govt. Arts and Commerce College and many others.

Tourism 
Netrang is located in the lap of nature. Nature at its best during the season of monsoon and winter. Here are some of the place(s) around the town you can visit during the season:

 Kadiya Dungar (13 km from netrang, on Rajpardi road)
 Vishal Khadi Campsite (20 km from netrang, on Rajpipala road)
 Timroliya Dasha Maa Temple, Arethi (09 km from netrang, on Dediyapada road)
Baladava Dam (04 km from netrang, on Dediyapada road)
Ghanikut (Rampam Waterfall) (13 km from netrang, on Dediyapada road)

See also
 Kingdom of Rajpipla
 List of state highways in Gujarat

References

Cities and towns in Bharuch district